William C. Farabee (1865–1925), the second individual to obtain a doctorate in physical anthropology from Harvard University, engaged in a wide range of anthropological work during his time as a professor at Harvard and then as a researcher at the University Museum, Philadelphia, but is best known for his work in human genetics and his ethnographic and geographic work in South America.

He was an 1894 graduate of Waynesburg College.

Genetics research
Farabee demonstrated that Mendelian genetics operate in man.  The founder of genetics, Gregor Mendel, published the results of his studies on pea plants and heredity in 1865.  The work of Mendel was not recognized for its importance until it was rediscovered in 1900.  During the intervening 35 years, the "discovery of chromosomes and their behavior in cell division and gametogenesis, and intensive study of cell biological variation, and…a conceptual framework for a theory of heredity, development, and evolution" all came about (Stern 1965).  "The time was ripe for Mendelism" according to Stern (Ibid).  Mendel had been interested in seeing if his work with dominant and recessive characteristics was applicable to men, but it was Farabee’s work that confirmed this and helped found the study of human genetics.

Farabee was a student of William E. Castle at Harvard.  His dissertation, entitled “Heredity and Sexual Influences In Meristic Variation: A Study of Digital Malformations in Man” (Gao, 2004), was published in 1903. The bulk of his research was regarding a hereditary conditions that primarily afflicts the hands of individuals, entitled Brachydactyly.

Brachydactyly is a dominant genetic trait that is characterized by shortened fingers and shortened stature.  Farabee noticed that this trait ran in families (Farabee 1905).  For his dissertation research, Farabee chose a family affected by this trait and followed their pedigree back five generations.  By doing so he showed that the ratio of those with and without brachydactyly followed a pattern explained by Mendel’s pattern of inheritance.  The children of an abnormal (A) individual, and a normal (N) individual, had a close to fifty percent chance of being abnormal.  Farabee stated that an abnormal individual typically would have a genotype of AN, and the family’s practice of exogamy meant that their spouse would have a genotype of NN.  By crossing the two, ANxNN, the offspring could be normal or abnormal with an equal chance of either.  Because the trait is dominant, if an individual does not carry the trait, they are homozygous normal and have no risk of passing the trait on to their children, which Farabee also studied in his pedigrees.

Farabee also published on the occurrence of recessive traits in man (Castle, 1903).  While in the South, he met several albino African-American individuals, and after inquiring into their family background, noticed that the albino trait followed the 3:1 ratio in the second generation that is typical of recessive genotypes.

Travels in South America
Following his work in genetics, Farabee began working in South America.  His goal was to record the cultural diversity and obtain items for the Penn Museum of Archaeology and Anthropology in Philadelphia, where he was employed as a researcher and curator.  He made three trips to the Amazon basin, each lasting several years.  During his last trip he contracted an illness that led to his death.

While in South America, Farabee traveled into very remote regions.  He helped to fill in maps of locations where there had not been any previous exploration.  On several occasions he was the first man of European descent that the natives had seen.  In other locations he witnessed the atrocities that were taking places by slave hunters, such as the story of Simasiri, a translator for the expedition, who witnessed his family sold into slavery or killed by the traders (Farabee, 1922).

The notes taken by Farabee were regarding the many different aspects of the cultures he encountered, such as dance, cosmology, marriage, dress, and particularly their varying languages.  They are detailed accounts, and were often obtained from the villagers themselves.  The ethnologies followed a set outline of characteristics to record, but in spite of this there is a great deal of personal detail and rich account of the people.

While in South America, Farabee also took note of the archaeological sites that they came across.  He freely collected artifacts that he thought would be suitable for the Museum and shipped them back to Philadelphia.  His array of pottery, beadwork, clothing, ornaments and other artifacts represent an amazing cultural diversity.

The volumes that Farabee produced from his travels include Indian Tribes of Eastern Peru based on his first trip in 1906–1908 (Obituary, 1925).  His second trip, from 1913–1916, is retold in The Central Arawaks and The Central Caribs.  His final trip was in 1921–1923.  Each of these books details the people he met and studied, and the cultural groups each belonged to.

Farabee held fairly modern views regarding the people that inhabited the Amazon.  He felt that all cultures are a product of their environment and that there is no way to separate culture and the influence that the surrounding world has had on it (Farabee, 1917).  He stated that “…there are no primitive men, neither is there primitive culture,” (Ibid), which was a novel concept at a time when man was still often viewed in terms of the size of his crania.  Although this did not preclude him from obtaining anthropometric data during his travels.  Farabee went on to state that “Man has been able to profit by his knowledge of nature’s laws, but he has not overcome them” (Farabee 1917).  This statement was also innovative because mankind was typically viewed as the apex of creation and able to overcome his natural environment.  It was Farabee’s experiences among individuals very much at the mercy of the rivers, forests and diseases that led him to these conclusions.

Legacy
Within the academic community, Farabee was a respected anthropologist.  He did not produce any doctorates in physical anthropology during his time teaching at Harvard, which has earned him some criticism, there may be political reasons for this.  While Farabee was more interested in research than teaching, and may not have attracted students for this reason, it has been noted that Putnam may have also had a stifling effect on the department at the time (Spencer, 1981).  In addition to the lack of students, Farabee also faced personal insults in print, such as those presented in a rebuttal by Farabee (1921), when he was criticized for his report on the Arawak people.

Farabee was the recipient of several noteworthy awards and recognitions.  He was appointed as an honorary member of the faculty at the University of San Marcos in Lima, Peru.  President Hastings selected his as a member of the American Commission to the Peruvian Centennial with the rank of Envoy Extraordinary (deMilhau, 1922).  Additionally, he was an ethnographer in the American Commission to Negotiate Peace, in Paris during 1918–1919 (Obituary, 1925).

William Farabee was a notable member of the anthropological community.  His contributions to the early field of genetics helped pave the way for future research.  His explorations in South America recorded data that is fascinating to some (though intensely boring to others) and represents the cultures of the region before foreigners influenced them.  Although he did not leave any academic progeny, his ideas and research remain with us today.

References

No Author (1925) Obituary: William Curtis Farabee. Geographical Review 15:675.
Castle, W.E. (1903) Note on Mr. Farabee’s Observations. Science 17: 75–76.
deMilhau, L.J. (1922) Introduction. Indian Tribes of Eastern Peru by W.C. Farabee. 	Papers of the Peabody Museum of American Archaeology and Ethnology Volume 	X.
Farabee, W.C. (1905) "Inheritance of Digital Malformations in Man." Papers of the Peabody Museum of the American Archaeology and Ethnology 3: 65–78.
Farabee, W.C. (1917) "The South American Indian in His Relation to Geographic Environment." Proceedings of the American Philosophical Society 56: 281–288.
Farabee, W.C. (1918) The Central Arawaks. University of Pennsylvania, the University Museum Anthropological Publications Volume IX.
Farabee, W.C. (1921) "The Central Arawaks: A Reply to Dr. Roth." American Anthropologist 23: 230–233.
Farabee, W.C. (1922) "Indian Tribes of Eastern Peru." Papers of the Peabody Museum of 	American Archaeology and Ethnology Volume X.
Farabee, W.C. (1967) "The Central Caribs." University of Pennsylvania, the University 	Museum Anthropological Publications Volume X. Reprint of 1924 edition.
Gao, B., and L. He (2004) "Answering A Century Old Riddle: Brachydactyly Type A1." Cell Research 14: 179–187.
Spencer, F. (1981) "The Rise of Academic Physical Anthropology in the United States: A 	Historical Overview." American Journal of Physical Anthropology 56: 353–364.
Stern, C. (1965) "Mendel and Human Genetics." Proceedings of the American Philosophical Society, 109: 216–226.

1865 births
1925 deaths
Harvard Graduate School of Arts and Sciences alumni
American anthropologists
American geneticists